West Covina Unified School District (WCUSD) is a unified school district located and serves the city of West Covina, California. It is located in the San Gabriel Valley area. The members of the West Covina Board of Education are Eileen Miranda-Jimenez (Vice-President), Steve Cox (President), Mike Spence (Clerk), Cammie Poulos (Member), and Jessica Showmaker (Member).  The last Superintendent of WCUSD was Liliam Leis-Castillo who was dismissed as superintendent of schools by the current school board on Thursday, May 12, 2011.

Schools
There are 2 high schools (plus an alternative and an continuation), 3 middle schools, 8 elementary schools in the district.

Elementary Schools
California Elementary School (3-6)
Cameron Elementary School (K-5)
Merced Elementary School (K-5)
Merlinda Elementary School (K-6)
Monte Vista Elementary School (K-6)
Orangewood Elementary School (K-5)
Vine Elementary School (K-5)
Wescove Elementary School (K-2)

Middle and Intermediate Schools
Edgewood Middle School (6-8)
Hollencrest Middle School (6-8)
Walnut Grove Intermediate School (7-8)
High Schools
MT. SAC Early College Academy
Coronado High School
Edgewood High School
West Covina High School

References

External links
WCUSD Website

 
School districts in Los Angeles County, California